Emilio Palomino (ca. 1880 – unknown death date) was a Cuban baseball outfielder in the Cuban League. He played from 1901 to 1912 with several Cuban ballclubs, but he played mostly with the Almendares club. He was elected to the Cuban Baseball Hall of Fame in 1956.

In 1904 and 1905, Palomino played for the All Cubans, and in 1906 he played for the Negro league Cuban X-Giants.

References

External links

1880s births
Cuban League players
Cuban baseball players
All Cubans players
Almendares (baseball) players
Club Fé players
Cuban X-Giants players
Azul (baseball) players
Habana players
San Francisco (baseball) players
Year of death missing